Everywhere is the fourth studio album of American country music artist Tim McGraw. It was released on June 3, 1997. It was his first release since his marriage to Faith Hill. Their collaboration on this album, "It's Your Love", was nominated for Best Country Collaboration With Vocals and Best Country Song at the 1998 Grammy Awards. This was Tim's first album to have a crossover-friendly country-pop sound, which was a departure from his earlier neotraditional country albums.

Singles released from this album include the number one Hot Country Songs hits "It's Your Love", "Everywhere", "Just to See You Smile" and "Where the Green Grass Grows", as well as the #2-peaking "One of These Days" (originally recorded by Marcus Hummon on his 1995 album All in Good Time) and "For a Little While". Both "It's Your Love" and "Just to See You Smile" were declared as number one country hits of the year by Billboard, for 1997 and 1998 respectively. "You Turn Me On" also entered the lower regions of the country charts from unsolicited airplay.

"You Just Get Better All the Time" was previously recorded by Tony Joe White on his 1983 album "Dangerous" and by James House on his 1990 album Hard Times for an Honest Man. "You Turn Me On" was later recorded as "Dumaflache" by Daryle Singletary on his compilation album "Now and Again".

Track listing

Personnel

Musicians
 Tim McGraw – lead vocals
 Steve Nathan – acoustic piano, keyboards 
 Matt Rollings – acoustic piano
 Larry Byrom – acoustic guitar
 J. T. Corenflos – acoustic guitar
 B. James Lowry – acoustic guitar
 Biff Watson – acoustic guitar
 Dann Huff – electric guitar
 Michael Landau – electric guitar
 Brent Rowan – electric guitar
 Pat Buchanan – electric guitar (11)
 Paul Franklin – steel guitar
 Sonny Garrish – steel guitar
 Mark Casstevens – banjo (9)
 Mike Brignardello – bass 
 Lonnie Wilson – drums
 Glen Duncan – fiddle
 Stuart Duncan – fiddle
 Bob Mason – cello (6)
 Curtis Wright – backing vocals
 Curtis Young – backing vocals
 Faith Hill – backing vocals (3)
 Timothy B. Schmit – backing vocals (8)

Production
 Byron Gallimore – producer 
 Tim McGraw – producer, creative director 
 James Stroud – producer 
 Chris Lord-Alge – recording, mixing 
 Dennis Davis – additional recording 
 Julian King – additional recording 
 Ricky Cobble – recording assistant 
 Tony Green – recording assistant
 Rich Hanson – recording assistant
 Terri Wong – vocal recording  of Timothy B. Schmit (8)
 Missi Callis – song assistant (8)
 Michelle Metzger – song assistant (8)
 Doug Sax – mastering 
 Kelly Wright – creative director 
 Glenn Sweitzer – art direction, design 
 Russ Harrington – photography

Chart performance

Weekly charts

Year-end charts

Singles

Certifications

References

External links
Everywhere at countrymusic.about.com

1997 albums
Tim McGraw albums
Curb Records albums
Albums produced by Byron Gallimore
Albums produced by James Stroud
Albums produced by Tim McGraw